Mateus William Sabino Silva (born 18 May 1999), commonly known as Sabino, is a Brazilian footballer who plays as either a defensive midfielder or centre-back.

Club career
Born in Osasco, São Paulo, Sabino joined América Mineiro's youth setup in 2018, from Audax. He made his first team debut on 17 March 2019, coming on as a late substitute for Marcelo Toscano in a 2–3 Campeonato Mineiro away loss against Atlético Mineiro.

On 31 December 2019, Sabino was loaned to Villa Nova for the 2020 Mineiro. Upon returning, he renewed his contract until June 2021 on 20 August 2020.

On 20 April 2021, after being more regularly used as a defensive midfielder, Sabino further extended his contract until the end of the year. He made his Série A debut on 17 June, replacing Juninho Valoura in a 0–0 home draw against Cuiabá.

Career statistics

References

External links
América Mineiro profile 

1999 births
Living people
People from Osasco
Brazilian footballers
Footballers from São Paulo (state)
Association football defenders
Association football midfielders
Campeonato Brasileiro Série A players
Campeonato Brasileiro Série B players
América Futebol Clube (MG) players
Villa Nova Atlético Clube players
Esporte Clube Santo André players